David Volek (born 16 August 1966) is a Czech former professional ice hockey player.

Volek was born in the former Czechoslovakia, where he played in 1983–84 for TJ Slavia PS Karlovy Vary. He later moved to HC Sparta Praha and became a member of the Czechoslovakian national ice hockey team for the 1988 Winter Olympics. In 1988 he gained permission from the Czech authorities to visit his parents in West Germany and used this permission to defect to Canada. He joined the New York Islanders, having been selected by them in the 1984 NHL Entry Draft, and was named to the NHL All-Rookie Team in 1988–89.

Volek is best remembered for scoring an overtime goal that eliminated the favoured and two-time defending Stanley Cup champion Pittsburgh Penguins from the 1993 Stanley Cup playoffs.  The goal came at 5:16 of overtime in the seventh (and deciding) game of the second round of the playoffs.  CBC Hockey Night in Canada announcer Chris Cuthbert called Volek's play in a dramatic fashion: 

The next year, a herniated disc forced Volek to retire from the NHL. Volek finished his NHL career, which was spent exclusively with the Islanders, with 95 goals and 154 assists for 249 points. He underwent back surgery the following year in an attempt to return to the game, but after five games with HC Sparta Praha, he was forced to retire for good.

Volek has been the assistant coach of HC Sparta Praha since 2005. Between his retirement from playing in 1996 and 2005 he was a scout.

Career statistics

Regular season and playoffs

International

References

External links
 
 
 
 

1966 births
Living people
Buffalo Sabres scouts
Calgary Flames scouts
Czech ice hockey coaches
Czech ice hockey forwards
Czechoslovak ice hockey forwards
HC Sparta Praha players
Ice hockey players at the 1988 Winter Olympics
New York Islanders draft picks
New York Islanders players
Olympic ice hockey players of Czechoslovakia
Ice hockey people from Prague
Vancouver Canucks scouts
Czechoslovak expatriate sportspeople in the United States
Czechoslovak defectors
Czech expatriate ice hockey players in the United States
Czechoslovak expatriate sportspeople in Canada
Czechoslovak expatriate ice hockey people